San Nicolás Buenos Aires is a town and municipality in Puebla in south-eastern Mexico.

Its highest elevation is the rhyolitic twin dome volcano Las Derrumbadas (3480 m).

References

Municipalities of Puebla